Harry Wolf may refer to:

Harry Benjamin Wolf (1880–1944), American politician
Harry Wolf (architect), American architect

See also
 Harry DeWolf (1903–2000), Canadian naval officer